Nicholas Benton "Ben" Alexander III (June 27, 1911 – July 5, 1969) was an American motion picture actor, who started out as a child actor in 1916. He is best remembered for his role as Officer Frank Smith in the Dragnet franchise.

Life and career

After a number of silent films, he retired from screen work, but came back for the World War I classic, All Quiet on the Western Front (1930), in which Alexander received good notices as an adult actor as "Kemmerick", the tragic amputation victim. 

He found a new career as a successful radio announcer in the late 1940s, including a stint on The Martin and Lewis Show. Alexander also acted on radio, playing Philip West in the 1939–40 soap opera Brenthouse on the Blue Network.

In 1952, Jack Webb, actor-producer-director of Dragnet, needed a replacement for Barton Yarborough, who had played Detective Romero opposite Webb's Sgt. Joe Friday. Webb selected Alexander, but had to wait until he was available. A few actors filled in as Friday's partners until Alexander appeared in the newly created role of Officer Frank Smith, first in the radio series, then reprised the role in film and on television. The popular series ran until 1959. When Webb revived it in 1966, he wanted Alexander to rejoin him, but Alexander had just signed to play the role of Sgt. Dan Briggs on the weekly ABC series Felony Squad.

On July 5, 1969, Alexander was found dead of heart attack in his Los Angeles home when his wife and children returned from a camping trip. He was cremated.

For his contribution to the entertainment industry, Ben Alexander was awarded three stars on the Hollywood Walk of Fame for television, radio, and movies.

Other

Alexander owned and operated the Ben Alexander Ford car dealership in the Highland Park neighborhood of northeast Los Angeles, from around 1953 until his death in 1969, and a San Francisco branch was formed in 1959.  

In the mid-1950s, Ben Alexander's Dream House Motel was located at 1815 North Cahuenga Blvd. in Hollywood. In the late 1950s and early 1960s, Alexander ran a talent show for young people out of Oakland. The Ben Alexander Talent Show was broadcast on Oakland's KTVU TV, a local station in the San Francisco Bay Area. 

In 1960, he was a semi-regular panelist on Ernie Kovacs' offbeat game show, Take a Good Look, as well as hosting his own daytime audience-participation show, About Faces, both airing on ABC.

Filmography

 Each Pearl a Tear (1916)
 The Little American (1917) - Bobby Moore
 What Money Can't Buy (1918) - Child
 Hearts of the World (1918) - The Boy's Littlest Brother
 The Lady of the Dugout (1918) - The Lady's Son
 The Heart of Rachael (1918) - Jim
 The One Woman (1918) - Boy
 Little Orphant Annie (1918) - Orphan
 The Turn in the Road (1919) - Bob
 The White Heather (1919) - Donald Cameron
 Josselyn's Wife (1919) - Tommy Josselyn
 The Hushed Hour (1919) - Gondy
 The Mayor of Filbert (1919) - Carroll
 Tangled Threads (1919) - 'Sonny Boy' Wayne
 The Better Wife (1919) - Little Dick
 The Triflers (1920) - Rupert Holbrook
 The Family Honor (1920) - Little Ben Tucker
 The Notorious Mrs. Sands (1920) - Child
 Through Eyes of Men (1920) - Little Billy
 Blue Streak McCoy (1920)
 The Heart Line (1921) - The Child
 In the Name of the Law (1922) - Harry O'Hara - age 9, prologue
 Penrod and Sam (1923) - Penrod Schofield
 The Yankee Spirit (1923, Short)
 Jealous Husbands (1923) - Bobbie (later called Spud)
 Boy of Mine (1923) - Bill Latimer
 Barnum Junior (1924, Short)
 Junior Partner (1924, Short)
 A Self-Made Failure (1924) - Sonny
 Dirty Hand (1924, Short)
 Flaming Love (1925) - Benny Keene
 Pampered Youth (1925) - George Minafer, as a child
 Wildcat Willie (1925, Short)
 The Shining Adventure (1925) - Benny
 The Highbinders (1926) - Roy Marshall
 Scotty of the Scouts (1926) - Scotty Smith
 Fighting for Fame (1927) - Danny Ryan
 Two to One (1927)
 The Divine Lady (1929) - Young Lieutenant (uncredited)
 The Lunkhead (1929, Short) - Ben - Billy's Chum
 All Quiet on the Western Front (1930) - Franz Kemmerich
 Many a Slip (1931) - Ted Coster
 It's a Wise Child (1931) - Bill Stanton
 Are These Our Children? (1931) - Nicholas 'Nick' Crosby
 Suicide Fleet (1931) - Kid
 A Wise Child (1931)
 Mystery Ship (1931)
 High Pressure (1932) - Geoffrey Weston
 The Wet Parade (1932) - Evelyn's Friend (uncredited)
 Tom Brown of Culver (1932) - Cpl. John Clarke
 The Vanishing Frontier (1932) - Lucien Winfield
 Alias the Professor (1933, Short) 
 Mister Mugg (1933, Short)
 Roadhouse Queen (1933, Short) - Junior Knox
 Daddy Knows Best (1933, Short) - Billy Todd
 What Price Innocence? (1933) - Tommy Harrow
 This Day and Age (1933) - Morry Dover
 Stage Mother (1933) - Francis Nolan
 Once to Every Woman (1934) - Joe
 The Most Precious Thing in Life (1934) - Gideon 'Gubby' Gerhart
 The Life of Vergie Winters (1934) - Barry Preston
 Flirtation (1934) - Dudley
 Grand Old Girl (1935) - Tom Miller
 Born to Gamble (1935) - Paul Mathews
 Reckless Roads (1935) - Wade Adams
 Annapolis Farewell (1935) - Adams
 Splendor (1935) - Western Union Messenger (uncredited)
 The Fire Trap (1935) - Bob Fender
 Hearts in Bondage (1936) - Eggleston
 Red Lights Ahead (1936) - George Wallace
 Shall We Dance (1937) - Evans - a Bandleader (uncredited)
 The Legion of Missing Men (1937) - Don Carter
 The Outer Gate (1937) - Bob Terry
 Western Gold (1937) - Bart
 The Life of the Party (1937) - Orchestra Leader (uncredited)
 The Spy Ring (1938) - Capt. Don Mayhew
 Russian Dressing (1938, Short) - Band Leader Bill Farraday
 Mr. Doodle Kicks Off (1938) - Larry Weldon
 Convict's Code (1939) - Jeff Palmer
 Buried Alive (1939) - Riley
 The Leather Pushers (1940) - Dan Brown, Announcer
 Criminals Within  (1941) - Sgt. Paul, the Traitor
 Dragnet (1954) - Officer Frank Smith
 Man in the Shadow (1957) - Ab Begley

Television
 The Joseph Cotten Show, also known as On Trial (1 episode, 1957)
 The Ford Show, Starring Tennessee Ernie Ford (January 24, 1957)
 Dragnet (regular, 1952–1959) - Officer Frank Smith
 Take A Good Look (Semi-regular 1959–1960) - Himself / Panelist
 About Faces (1960–1961) - Himself - Host
 Batman (1 episode, 1966) - Detective Beside Trash Can
 Felony Squad (Unknown episodes, 1966–1969) - Desk Sgt. Dan Briggs
 Judd, for the Defense (1 episode, 1969)

Writer
 Dragnet (Co-writer, 6 episodes)

References

Further reading
 
 Holmstrom, John. The Moving Picture Boy: An International Encyclopaedia from 1895 to 1995, Norwich, Michael Russell, 1996, pp. 49–51.
 Dye, David. Child and Youth Actors: Filmography of Their Entire Careers, 1914-1985. Jefferson, NC: McFarland & Co., 1988, p. 4.

External links

American male film actors
American male television actors
1911 births
1969 deaths
American male child actors
American male silent film actors
American male radio actors
Male actors from Nevada
People from Goldfield, Nevada
20th-century American male actors